The Gauliga Mittelrhein was the highest football league in the central and southern part of the Prussian Rhine Province from 1933 to 1945. Shortly after the formation of the league, the Nazis reorganised the administrative regions in Germany, and the Gaue Köln-Aachen  and Moselland replaced the Prussian province in the Middle Rhine (German: Mittelrhein) region.

From 1941, the Gauliga Mittelrhein was split into two separate leagues, the Gauliga Köln-Aachen and the Gauliga Moselland. From this time, it also included clubs from the occupied Luxembourg and the Belgian region of Eupen-Malmedy.

Overview

Gauliga Mittelrhein
The league was introduced by the Nazi Sports Office in 1933, after the Nazi takeover of power in Germany. It replaced the Bezirksligas and Oberligas as the highest level of play in German football competitions.

In its first season, the league had eleven clubs, playing each other once at home and once away. The league champion then qualified for the German championship. The bottom three teams were relegated. The season after, the league was reduced to ten teams and remained at this strength until 1939. From 1937, it also included Alemannia Aachen which had previously belonged to the Gauliga Niederrhein.

Due to the outbreak of World War II  in 1939, the league was split into two regional groups, a northern division of seven and a southern of six clubs. The two group champions then played a home-and-away final for the Gauliga championship.

In its last season, 1940–41, the league returned to a single-division, ten-team format. At the end of this season, the league was split into two separate Gauligas, divided along the administrative divisions of the two Gaue.

Gauliga Köln-Aachen
The territory of the new Gauliga Köln-Aachen was made up of the area of the Gau Köln-Aachen and the Eupen-Malmedy region, the German-speaking part of Belgium which had been annexed to the Gau after the German victory in 1940. However, no club from this formerly Belgian region played at highest level during the war.

The league started with nine clubs in a single division in 1941 and expanded to ten for the 1942-43 season. In its last completed season, 1943–44, it returned to a strength of nine teams. Due to the arrival of the war in the region and the conquest of Aachen by the allied forces, the last season probably not started anymore at all.

Gauliga Moselland
The territory of the new Gauliga Moselland was made up of the area of the Gau Moselland and Luxembourg, which had been annexed by Germany and added to the Gau after the German victory in 1940.

The league started out with two regional divisions of six clubs each with a home-and-away final to determine the Gauliga champion. The western group compromised two clubs from the city of Trier and four Luxembourgian clubs. The league modus remained the same for the 1942-43 season but the number of clubs from Luxembourg increased to five.

In the 1943-44 season, the eastern group comprised five teams while the western had seven clubs. With the arrival of allied forces in the region in late 1944, football was of low priority and the last season, 1944-45 was probably not started any more.

Aftermath
With the end of the Nazi era, the Gauligas ceased to exist and the northern part of the region found itself in the British occupation zone while the south became part of the French zone. The annexed regions of Belgium and Luxembourg were taken from Germany again after 1945.

The Oberliga Südwest was introduced as the highest football league in the French occupation zone in 1945, replacing the Gauliga. The territory of the pre-1940 Gau Moselland became part of the new state of Rhineland-Palatinate.

In the British zone, which the former Gau Köln-Aachen was part of, top-level football did not resume straight away, unlike in Southern Germany, and only in 1947 was a new, highest league introduced, the Oberliga West, which covered all of the new state of North Rhine-Westphalia.

Founding members of the league
The eleven founding members and their league positions in the 1932-33 season were:
 Mülheimer SV 06
 VfR 04 Köln
 SpVgg Sülz 07, champion Rhein division
 Eintracht Trier
 Bonner FV
 SV Westmark 05 Trier
 Kölner CfR
 Kölner SC 99
 FV 1911 Neuendorf
 Fortuna Kottenheim, champion Mittelrhein division
 SV Rhenania Köln

Winners and runners-up of the league
The winners and runners-up of the league:

Gauliga Mittelrhein

Gauliga Köln-Aachen

Gauliga Moselland

Placings in the league 1933-44
The complete list of all clubs participating in the league:

Gauliga Mittelrhein & Köln-Aachen

 1 In May 1937, SC 99 Köln and CfR  Köln merged to form VfL 99 Köln.
 2 SpVgg Andernach  joined the new Gauliga Moselland in 1941.
 3 The following “war sport unions” (German: KSG) were formed between clubs in 1943:
 VfL 99 Köln  and SpVgg Sülz 07 formed KSG VfL 99 Köln/SpVgg Sülz 07.
 VfR Köln  and SV Mülheim formed KSG VfR/Mülheimer SV.
 Bonner FV and TuRa Bonn formed KSG Bonn.
 4 Title awarded to SV Beuel 06 after the end of season, however, Alemannia Aachen took part in the German championship.

Gauliga Moselland

 4 Eintracht Trier and Westmark Trier formed KSG Trier for the 1943-44 season.

Clubs from Luxembourg in the Gauliga Moselland
From 1941, clubs from the occupied country of Luxembourg took part in the German Gauliga system. The most successful of those was the FV Stadt Düdelingen, who reached the German championship finals round, losing to the FC Schalke 04 0-2 in 1942.

The following clubs played in the Gauliga under their Germanised names:
 FV Stadt Düdelingen,  was Stade Dudelange
 FK Niederkorn, was Progrès Niedercorn
 Moselland Luxemburg, was Spora Luxembourg
 SV Düdelingen, was US Dudelange
 SV Schwarz-Weiß Esch, was Jeunesse d'Esch
 Schwarz-Weiß Wasserbillig, was Jeunesse Wasserbillig

References

Sources
 Die deutschen Gauligen 1933-45 - Heft 1-3  Tables of the Gauligas 1933-45, publisher: DSFS
 Kicker Almanach,  The yearbook on German football from Bundesliga to Oberliga, since 1937, published by the Kicker Sports Magazine

External links
  The Gauligas Das Deutsche Fussball Archiv
 Germany - Championships 1902-1945 at RSSSF.com

Sports leagues established in 1933
1933 establishments in Germany
Gauliga
Football competitions in North Rhine-Westphalia
Football competitions in Rhineland-Palatinate
Football leagues in Luxembourg
Football leagues in Belgium
Sport in Liège Province
History of Liège Province
German-speaking Community of Belgium